KwaZulu-Natal (formerly Natal) is the first-class cricket team that represents the province of KwaZulu-Natal (formerly Natal) in South Africa. For the purposes of the Sunfoil Series, KwaZulu-Natal is the only team that has not merged with another and it has played in the SuperSport Series (as it was named then) as the Dolphins since October 2004. However, the KwaZulu-Natal Inland cricket team was granted first-class status in 2006, began competing in the CSA Provincial Competitions in 2006-2007, and also represented by the Dolphins franchise. The team was originally called Natal and began playing in December 1889 at the start of first-class cricket in South Africa. The name changed in April 1998.

Honours
 Currie Cup (21) - 1910–11, 1912–13, 1933–34, 1936–37, 1946–47, 1947–48, 1951–52, 1954–55, 1959–60, 1960–61, 1962–63, 1963–64, 1966–67, 1967–68, 1973–74, 1975–76, 1976–77, 1980–81, 1994–95, 1996–97, 2001–02; shared (3) - 1921–22, 1937–38, 1965–66
 Standard Bank Cup (4) - 1983–84, 1996–97, 2000–01, 2001–02
 South African Airways Provincial Three-Day Challenge (0) - 
 South African Airways Provincial One-Day Challenge (1) - 2006–07
 Gillette Cup/Nissan Shield (3) - 1974–75, 1976–77, 1987–88

Venues
Venues have included:
 Albert Park, Durban (April 1895 - Jan 1906)
 City Oval, Pietermaritzburg (alternative venue April 1895 - Dec 2002)
 Lord's, Durban (March 1898 - April 1922)
 Kingsmead, Durban (Jan 1923–present)
 Jan Smuts Stadium, Pietermaritzburg (Feb 1959 - Dec 1995)
 Settler's Park, Ladysmith (three games Jan 1971 - March 1973)
 Lahee Park, Pinetown (occasional venue Jan 1974 - Dec 1979)
 Alexandra Memorial Ground, Umzinto (used twice 1974 - 1977)

Squad
In April 2021, Cricket South Africa confirmed the following squad ahead of the 2021–22 season.

 Marques Ackerman
 Ottneil Baartman
 Eathan Bosch
 Ruan de Swardt
 Daryn Dupavillon
 Sarel Erwee
 Thamsanqa Khumalo
 Kerwin Mungroo
 Lifa Ntanzi
 Thando Ntini
 Bryce Parsons
 Keegan Petersen
 Grant Roelofsen
 Jason Smith
 Prenelan Subrayen
 Khaya Zondo
 Andile Phehlukwayo
 David Miller
 Keshav Maharaj

References

Sources
 South African Cricket Annual – various editions
 Wisden Cricketers' Almanack – various editions

South African first-class cricket teams
Cricket in KwaZulu-Natal
1889 establishments in the Colony of Natal